Parque Abraham Paladino is a multi-use stadium in Montevideo, Uruguay.  It is currently used primarily for football matches and is the home ground of CA Progreso.  The stadium holds 8,000 spectators and was built in 1983.

References

Buildings and structures completed in 1983
Multi-purpose stadiums in Uruguay
Football venues in Montevideo
C.A. Progreso